Captain James Hook is a fictional character and the main antagonist of J. M. Barrie's 1904 play Peter Pan; or, the Boy Who Wouldn't Grow Up and its various adaptations, in which he is Peter Pan's archenemy. The character is a pirate captain of the brig Jolly Roger. His two principal fears are the sight of his own blood (supposedly an unnatural colour) and the crocodile who pursues him after eating the hand cut off by Pan. An iron hook replaced his severed hand, which gave the pirate his name.

Creation of the character

Hook did not appear in early drafts of the play, wherein the capricious and coercive Peter Pan was closest to a "villain", but was created for a front-cloth scene (a cloth flown well downstage in front of which short scenes are played while big scene changes are "silently" carried out upstage) depicting the children's journey home. Later, Barrie expanded the scene, on the premise that children were fascinated by pirates, and expanded the role of the captain as the play developed. The character was originally cast to be played by Dorothea Baird, the actress playing Mary Darling, but Gerald du Maurier, already playing George Darling (and the brother of Sylvia Llewelyn Davies), persuaded Barrie to let him take the additional role instead, a casting tradition since replicated in many stage and film productions of the Peter Pan story.

According to A. N. Wilson, Barrie "openly acknowledged [that] Hook and his obsession with the crocodile was an English version of Ahab", and there are other borrowings from Melville.

Biography of the character
Barrie states in the novel that "Hook was not his true name. To reveal who he really was would even at this date set the country in a blaze". He is said to be "Blackbeard's bo'sun" and "the only man of whom Barbecue was afraid". (In Robert Louis Stevenson's Treasure Island, one of the names Long John Silver goes by is Barbecue.)

In the play, it is implied that Hook attended Eton College and Balliol College, Oxford, and his final words are "Floreat Etona", Eton's motto. In the novel, Hook's last words are a similarly upper-class "bad form", in disapproval of the way Peter Pan beats him by throwing him overboard.

The book relates that Peter Pan began the ongoing rivalry between them by feeding the pirate's hand to a crocodile. After getting a taste of Hook, the crocodile pursues him relentlessly, but the ticking clock it has also swallowed warns Hook of its presence.

Appearances

Peter Pan (play) and Peter and Wendy (novel)

Hook is described as "cadaverous" and "blackavised", with "eyes which were of the blue of the forget-me-not" ("save when he was plunging his hook into you, at which time two red spots appeared in them and lit them up horribly") and long dark curls resembling "black candles". In many pantomime performances of Peter Pan, Hook's hair is a wig and is accompanied by thick bushy eyebrows and moustache. The hook is fixed to his right hand (often changed to the left hand in film adaptations) and is used as a weapon. He is also described as having a "handsome countenance" and an "elegance of ... diction" – "even when he [is] swearing". Barrie describes "an attire associated with the name of Charles II, having heard it said in some earlier period of his career that he bore a strange resemblance to the ill-fated Stuarts". Hook's cigar holder enables him to smoke two cigars at once. Barrie also stated in "Captain Hook at Eton" that he was, "in a word, the handsomest man I have ever seen, though, at the same time, perhaps slightly disgusting". Although Hook is callous and bloodthirsty, Barrie makes it clear that these qualities make him a magnificent pirate and "not wholly unheroic".

Disney

In the animated film Peter Pan, Hook is a far more comical villain than the original character: he is seen as a vain coward with a childish temper who is prone to crying out in terror. During the film's early development, the story department analysed Hook's character as "a fop... Yet very mean, to the point of being murderous. This combination of traits should cause plenty of amusement whenever he talks or acts".

Frank Thomas was the directing animator of Hook. According to Disney's Platinum release bonus features, Hook was modeled after a Spanish King. One director insisted that Hook should be a darker villain with no comedic traits; but this was refused for fear of frightening a juvenile audience, and Hook became a comical villain, equally matched with Peter Pan.

Actor Hans Conried set the tone for Disney's interpretation of Hook, as he was the original voice for the Captain, as well as, in the tradition of the stage play, Mr. Darling, and performed live-action reference for the two characters. In subsequent Disney animation, Hook is voiced by Corey Burton.

Hook seeks revenge on Peter Pan for having fed the crocodile his left hand and refuses to leave Neverland prior to this revenge. Throughout the film, Hook is supported by Mr. Smee. After promising Tinker Bell not to lay a finger (or a hook) on Peter Pan, he plants a bomb in Peter's hideout (instead of Barrie's vial of poison). At the conclusion of the film, Hook is chased by the crocodile into the distance, with the rest of the crew trying to save Hook. Walt Disney insisted on keeping Hook alive, as he said: "The audience will get to liking Hook, and they don't want to see him killed."

Other film appearances
In the sequel Return to Never Land, Hook mistakes Wendy's daughter Jane for Wendy and uses her as bait to lure Peter Pan to his death. After this fails, he promises to take Jane home if she will help him find the island's treasure, and "not to harm a single hair on Peter Pan's head". This last promise is kept when he pulls a single hair from Peter's head, declaring "the rest of him is mine". At the end of the film, he and the crew are pursued into the distance by a giant octopus.

Captain Hook is one of the Disney Villains who have a main focus in the direct-to-video anthology film Once Upon a Halloween.

Captain Hook's origins are explored in the Disney Fairies film The Pirate Fairy, in which he is voiced by Tom Hiddleston. In the story, a young James years before he lost his hand, pretended to be a pirate ship's cabin boy and befriended a rebellious fairy Zarina who had left Pixie Hollow after being dismissed as a dust-keeper when her unauthorised experiments with pixie dust led to a disaster. James foresaw the great potential of the pixie dust and let Zarina think she had the authority over pirates.

In The Simpsons short film Welcome to the Club, Captain Hook appears along with other Disney Villains trying to convince Lisa Simpson how fun it is to be a villain.

Jude Law will play Hook in Disney's upcoming live-action film Peter Pan & Wendy, his hook now on the right, which adapts material from the 1953 animated film. In contrast to Barrie's original play and later Peter Pan adaptations, in which the same actor play Hook and Mr. Darling, the latter's role will be performed by a different actor, Alan Tudyk.

Joshua Colley will play a young Hook in the upcoming live-action film Descendants: The Pocketwatch, from the Descendants franchise. His teenage son Harry (portrayed by Thomas Doherty) appears in the previous films of the franchise Descendants 2 and Descendants 3, Captain Hook being only mentioned.

Television series
Captain Hook made a special guest cameo on Raw Toonage in the episode hosted by Don Karnage (air pirate of TaleSpin), wherein he challenged Karnage to a sword fight for a treasure chest and won.

Hook also appeared frequently on House of Mouse, and its two direct-to-video films Mickey's Magical Christmas: Snowed in at the House of Mouse and Mickey's House of Villains, being one of the main villains in the last one.

In the Disney Junior series Jake and the Never Land Pirates, Hook serves as the main antagonist, with his mother, Mama Hook, herself exclusive to the Disney Junior series, keeping him "honest" if he gets tempted.

Video games

Disney's Villains' Revenge
He stars in the Disney Interactive computer game Disney's Villains' Revenge as one of the main villains, wherein the player defeats Hook and returns Peter to his rightful age.

Kingdom Hearts
 appears in the Action/RPG game Kingdom Hearts, in cooperation with Maleficent and other villains. He uses his pirate ship to travel between worlds. His Japanese voice actor was Chikao Ōhtsuka up until Birth by Sleep, where Chikao Ōhtsuka was cast as Master Xehanort and Hook thus voiced by Naoya Uchida. His English voice actor is Corey Burton.

He takes Riku along with him, where Kairi is being held. Hook does not like Riku's bossiness and regrets taking him along; nonetheless, he follows his orders, as Riku now has control over the Heartless and would most likely unleash them on him should he disobey. When Sora, Donald, and Goofy arrive in Neverland, Riku throws them in the hold where they meet and escape with Peter Pan, who is searching for his friend Wendy. Captain Hook believed that Wendy was a "Princess of Heart" and that is why he captured her. However, Riku reports to him from Maleficent that Wendy is not a Princess of heart at all, irritating Hook (he hints that kidnapping Wendy was a very difficult task). After defeating the Heartless below deck, Sora fights a copy of himself summoned by Riku in Hook's office. After confronting Hook on the deck, learning that Riku took Kairi to Hollow Bastion, Sora and company are forced to surrender when Hook uses Tinker Bell as a hostage. When the crocodile appears, Hook flees to his office while telling Smee to have their prisoners walk the plank. However, Peter Pan returns to save Sora before imitating Smee to trick Hook out to the deck, resulting in the villain being thrown overboard and chased into the horizon by the crocodile.

In Kingdom Hearts: Chain of Memories he appears as a figment of Sora's memories. He later reappears in Kingdom Hearts 358/2 Days, finding a large number of treasure maps all leading to boxes that are actually set to release Heartless once Hook opens the chest (unknown to Hook and Smee, however, is that these chests were set up to help build Pete's Heartless army). Hook later appears in the game series prequel, Kingdom Hearts Birth by Sleep, where he tricks Terra into attempting to kill Peter Pan for him. He later kidnaps Tinker Bell and takes Mickey Mouse's star fragment, but is defeated by Ventus and thrown into the water, where the crocodile chases him off.

Epic Mickey
An animatronic version of Captain Hook is also featured prominently in the Wii game Epic Mickey, wherein he has been converting his crew into animatronic, cyborg version of themselves (referred to in the game as Beetleworx) and is waging an attack against the non-converted pirates. Smee requests that Mickey Mouse find a way to save Hook and stop this machine that is turning pirates into Beetleworx. Players can either fight Hook by themselves and earn a thinner upgrade (and a "bad ending") or free the Sprite and have Pete Pan (a version of Pete dressed up as Peter Pan) defeat him and earn a paint upgrade (and a "good ending" showing Pete Pan and Captain Hook in a duel). In Epic Mickey 2: The Power of Two, Hook has disappeared entirely, leaving his crew leaderless and having been run out of Tortooga by Blackbeard and Pete Pan having joined up with the Mad Doctor after losing his purpose. Some of Hook's clothes and items have been left behind in Ventureland, which the crew members seek to assert their authority to take over leadership of the other pirates and lead them to take back their home.

The Cartoon World's version of Hook appears in Epic Mickey: Power of Illusion as the first boss, having fallen under the control of Mizrabel to fight Mickey. Upon his defeat, he comes to his senses and offers his help to Mickey's quest to bring the toons back to the Cartoon World.

Disney Magic Kingdoms
Captain Hook is a playable character in the world builder game Disney Magic Kingdoms, being a premium character to unlock in the main storyline of the game.

Attractions and live events

Captain Hook appears at the Walt Disney Parks and Resorts as a meetable character along with Mr. Smee in Adventureland. He also appears as a figure during the dark ride Peter Pan's Flight.

In Fantasmic! at Disneyland, there is a scene in which we see Captain Hook and Peter Pan duelling aboard the Jolly Roger (portrayed by the Sailing Ship Columbia). This is replaced by a short re-enactment of Disney's Pocahontas at Disney's Hollywood Studios.

At Disney World's Dream-Along with Mickey show, Hook, along with Smee, is one of the villains that crashes Mickey's party. This happens when Peter and Wendy appear to make Goofy's dream for some adventure come true and play a game of "Pretend to Be Pirates" with Donald Duck, who pretends to be the captain until the real Hook appears and challenges Peter to a duel. At first, Hook's appearance seems to take place for no reason other than to add some action to the show but is revealed to actually be working for Maleficent, who is insulted after not being invited to the party. He is defeated by Mickey Mouse, who leads the audience in a chant of "Dreams come true!", and scares off the villains.

At the Disney Villains Mix and Mingle Halloween Dance Party at Mickey's Not-So-Scary Halloween Party, Hook is summoned up by Maleficent along with the other villains, and co-hosts along with her, revealed by him being the only one of the villains besides her to sing and also being the villain that dances with her.

Captain Hook was also featured in the Disney on Ice 2013 show 'Let's Party' as part of the Halloween celebration section, which takes the format of a party hosted by Jack Skellington where all the 'main' Disney villains attend (Evil Queen and Jafar being two other notable villains in the scene) and they plan to capture Mickey Mouse to plunge everyone into unhappiness.

Printed media
Occasionally, Hook appears in the Scrooge McDuck universe of comic books as the nemesis of Moby Duck, a whaler cousin of Donald Duck.

In the Kingdom Keepers series book Disney at Dawn (2008), Captain Hook was snooping around Ariel's Grotto, having been sent by the Overtakers in investigate the meaning in Jess playing songs over the park speakers.

In the Descendants franchise novels Isle of the Lost (2015) and its sequel Rise of the Isle of the Lost (2017), Captain Hook appears as one of the villains who live imprisoned on the titular island. He is also the father of Harriet (eldest daughter), Harry (middle son), and CJ (youngest daughter).

Hook (1991 film)

Captain James Hook is played by Dustin Hoffman in Hook. Hook kidnaps the children of the adult Peter to lure his arch-enemy back to Neverland and gives the middle-aged man three days to rekindle his spirit. Hook has been somewhat depressed since Peter Pan left Neverland to become Peter Banning (Robin Williams), and worries he has nothing left to accomplish; he has long since killed the crocodile and made a quiet clock tower out of its corpse. Despite killing the crocodile, he remains terrified of the sound of ticking clocks and has become increasingly paranoid of the crocodile coming back, often destroying clocks to cope. At Smee's suggestion, Hook attempts to persuade Peter's children that their father never loved them, in order to coerce them to stay in Neverland. He is successful with Jack, Peter's son, who soon sees Hook as the attentive father figure that Peter has never been, and Hook eventually sees Jack as a potential heir. Peter's daughter, Maggie, mistrusts Hook immediately and refuses to be swayed. Hook decides to hold Maggie hostage until Peter's failure to rescue her ruins her faith in him. This backfires when Peter and the Lost Boys rescue her immediately. Jack sees Hook stab Rufio to death in a duel and realises how much his father cares for the Lost Boys, rejecting the murderous Hook and embracing Peter once again. As Peter leaves the ship with his children and the Lost Boys, Hook orders him to come back. Maggie tells him off, stating Hook needs a mother to straighten his bad attitude. After Hook vows to kidnap future generations of children in Peter's family, Peter and Hook engage in a final duel amidst a circle of Lost Boys, Peter taunting Hook about the idea that the ticking clocks he fears are not reminders of the crocodile, but a reminder of time ticking away. After a close call where Tinker Bell deflects an attack with the hook, the crocodile clock tower seemingly comes to "life" and "eats" Hook when it falls on top of him.

Hook's missing hand is his left and his stump takes other attachments, including a baseball mitt and a pointer. He dresses very elegantly in a gold-trimmed red coat, matching hat, and a wig that hides his balding head. He wears a ceremonial captain's sword at his side, but uses a proper duelling sword when fighting Rufio and Peter. Hook's physical appearance in the film is heavily influenced by Disney's portrayal, though with more elaborate clothing trim and his moustache is curled. He is closer to Barrie's characterisation as a gentleman pirate than in Disney's version, however; for instance, he frequently describes certain behaviours as "good form" or "bad form" (although he is willing to violate these rules when it suits him, such as trying to stab Peter in the back during their climatic duel). Hoffman claimed to have based the character's voice and mannerisms on conservative columnist William F. Buckley Jr.

Peter Pan (2003 film)

In the 2003 film adaptation of Peter Pan, Captain Hook is portrayed by English actor Jason Isaacs, who also plays the role of George Darling, Wendy's father, following the tradition of the original play. Isaacs wears the hook on his right hand, supported by a shoulder harness.  Hook is feared and ruthless, but also gentlemanly. In the climactic duel, he learns to fly, almost defeating  Peter Pan, but the Lost Boys' taunts weaken the enthusiasm needed to fly, and he falls into the crocodile's mouth, accepting his fate.

Peter Pan in Scarlet
Geraldine McCaughrean's authorized sequel to Peter Pan gives Peter a new nemesis, while bringing back the old favourite.

Ravello, a circus man in a constantly ragged woollen coat, offers Peter a servant and to ensure his well being in the search for the treasure. Ravello provides – through a red coat and a bad influence – that Peter Pan is increasingly in the direction of Captain Hook turns. He sees himself not as a living person, because he only eats eggs and no longer sleeps there. He is revealed in the middle of the book to be the old James Hook, who escaped the crocodile, when the muscle contractions of the stomach meant to crush and digest Hook, which broke the vial of poison Hook kept with him at all times. The poison killed the crocodile, and Hook used his hook to claw out, but he was mutated by the stomach acid, changing Hook to an uglier man. The scarred visage that emerged from the crocodile's stomach was not the noble pirate who went forthwith from the deck of the Jolly Roger, but Ravello, the travelling man. Ravello has many animals in front: lions, bears, and tigers.

Ravello gives another clue to his true identity when one of the Lost Boys asks Ravello his name: he thinks for a while as if trying to remember, and finally says the name his mother gave him was Crichton, but that names given by mothers don't mean anything.

One of Ravello's trophies is an Eton trophy dated 1894. If Hook was 18 – the last year of an Etonian – in that year, then he was born in 1876, a full one-hundred and one years after his appearance at The Pirates' Conference [see below], and even further after the times of Blackbeard and Long John Silver. It must also be said that Hook in this book denies that he was ever with Blackbeard, claiming that he would never have served such an uneducated man and that all suggestions that he has are merely rumours started by his enemies. Only upon receiving Wendy's kiss, and five weeks' worth of sleep, does the real James Hook again reveal himself.

Capt. Hook: The Adventures of a Notorious Youth

According to the (2007 non-canon) novel Capt. Hook: The Adventures of a Notorious Youth, Captain Hook was the illegitimate son of a nobleman, "Lord B", and an unnamed woman Hook has never met (implied to be the Queen). Disowned by Lord B., James Matthew is reared by a Shakespearean actress he calls Aunt Emily, and unwillingly attends Eton College as an Oppidan scholar, where he is an avid reader of Shakespeare and Shelley, and his motto is "Knowledge is Power". He describes many things as first-rate – "Topping Swank", and punctuates his sentences with "The End". He is very interested in the French Revolution.

In the novel, James has only a few friends including Roger Peter Davies, whom he nicknames "Jolly Roger" (the name of his ship in later life), and the spider "Electra". A seventeen-year-old Colleger, Arthur Darling (named after Arthur Llewelyn Davies) is his rival in studies, fencing, sports, and the attentions of the visiting Ottoman Sultana Ananova Ariadne. When James successfully woos Ananova, their affection sets off political outrage that affects the noble position of Lord B., who arranges for James to leave Eton on his trading ship, the Sea Witch. Upon leaving, James defeats Arthur in a final duel and burns his own school records to leave no traces of his behaviour. On the Sea Witch, he befriends boatswain Bartholomew Quigley Smeethington, generally called Smee, frees the slaves aboard ship, overthrows the ship's captain (killed by Electra), and murders the quartermaster with a metal hook.

Throughout Capt. Hook, author J.V. Hart relates events in James Matthew Barrie's life and the lives of the Llewellyn Davies children. The narrative expands upon details of Barrie's original play and novel but ascribes James's unusual colouring and yellow blood to a blood disorder, makes James's long dark hair natural, rather than the usual wig, and has James titled "Hook" after murdering the quartermaster of the Sea Witch, rather than in reference to his prosthetic hand.

Peter and the Starcatchers

In the novel Peter and the Starcatchers by Dave Barry and Ridley Pearson, Captain Hook is distinguished by halitosis, beady black eyes, a pock-marked face, and perpetual filth of his person and surroundings contrasting strongly with J. M. Barrie's Etonian gentleman. The novel, which takes place before the Captain meets Peter Pan, calls Hook "Black Stache" for his prominent moustache, and his ship is called the Sea Devil; he captures the Jolly Roger, originally a British ship called the Wasp, later. Black Stache is renamed "Captain Hook" in the second instalment, Peter and the Shadow Thieves. In Barry and Pearson's book, his left hand is accidentally cut off by Peter.

In Rick Ellis' theatrical adaptation of the Barry-Pearson novel, Black Stache (portrayed in the original production by Christian Borle, who won a Tony Award for the role) is a witty, poetical, but psychotic pirate prone to malapropisms and the occasional pratfall. Similar to the Disney film character, Black Stache resembles both a dangerous villain and a comic buffoon. The last of a line of villains, he seeks to become a great villain by fighting a great hero, and finds one in Peter. His hand is cut off not by Peter, but accidentally severed when he slams the lid of a trunk in a fit of rage.

Other appearances

Peter Pan (1924 film)
In Peter Pan, Captain Hook is portrayed by Ernest Torrence.

Peter Pan (1950 musical)
In Leonard Bernstein's musical version, Boris Karloff starred as Mr. Darling/Captain Hook and Jean Arthur played Peter.

Peter Pan (1954 musical)
Most notably, Cyril Ritchard played Captain Hook in the 1954 musical adaptation which starred Mary Martin as Peter Pan. George Rose played the role in the 1977 revival which featured Sandy Duncan as Pan.

Peter Pan – The Animated Series (no boken)
In 1989, the Japanese Nippon Animation produced 41 episodes of Peter Pan – the Animated Series, aired on World Masterpiece Theater and in several other countries. Hook's personality was far closer to the original character from Barrie's novel. Apart from wanting to destroy Pan, he is also eager to become Neverland's first king. Hook has a second hook-hand that both looked and functioned like a crab claw.

He is voiced by Chikao Ōhtsuka, who also portrayed the Disney incarnation of the character in Japanese media, particularly in Kingdom Hearts and Kingdom Hearts: Chain of Memories.

Peter Pan and the Pirates
In 1990, Fox produced the television series Peter Pan and the Pirates, wherein Hook's costume was more early 18th century rather than the classic Charles II-Restoration period. He had white hair and wore black clothes. He was also clean-shaven, without a moustache. Hook's personality is closer to Barrie's original character: he terrifies his crew, brutalises his enemies, has no fear (except the crocodile), shows great intelligence, and is passionate about William Shakespeare's plays. He was voiced by Tim Curry, who won an Emmy for this part.

Pirates of the Caribbean
In A. C. Crispin's 2011 novel Pirates of the Caribbean: The Price of Freedom, Captain Hook appears in a conversation between Captain Teague and Pirate Lord Don Rafael: "You'll never guess who I encountered at Oporto a few months ago. [...] James. [...] He's lost a hand. [...]he said it wasn't so bad, the hook was as good as a dagger in a fight. [...] He didn't look a day older, not a day. [...] James was a lot more...subdued. [...] The taberna keeper's little lad came round to collect our plates, and when he turned and saw he, for just a second he looked—scared. No, worse than that. Terrified. [...] Can you imagine that? Afraid! Of a young boy!" One of the early concept arts for Pirates of the Caribbean: At World's End showed a pirate similar to Captain Hook as one of the Pirate Lords of the Fourth Brethren Court.

Shrek film series

Captain Hook is a minor character in the film Shrek 2, playing "Little Drop of Poison" by Tom Waits and "People Just Ain't No Good" by Nick Cave and the Bad Seeds on the piano in the "Poisoned Apple" tavern. In Shrek the Third, he has a greater role as a secondary villain and is voiced by Ian McShane.

Neverland (TV miniseries)
In the TV miniseries Neverland, James Hook is played by Rhys Ifans. He is introduced as "Jimmy", a fencing teacher and leader of a small group of juvenile pickpockets including Peter Pan with whom he has developed a father-son relationship. Jimmy is seeking a mysterious orb, which Peter and his gang have discovered unbeknownst to him. In the course of the miniseries, it is revealed that he actually killed Peter's father because he was in love with Peter's mother, with the watch that Hook owns having once belonged to Peter's father; the watch is lost with Hook's hand in their final confrontation when the crocodile swallows both.

Finding Neverland
During the film Finding Neverland, a biopic about Peter Pan's creator James Matthew Barrie, James finds inspiration for the character of Captain Hook from Sylvia's strict mother as she is holding a coat hanger to one of Sylvia's boys. James envisions the hook in place of the left hand.

Once Upon a Time
Captain Hook appears as a regular character in the TV series Once Upon a Time. He made his first appearance in the second-season episode "The Crocodile". The character is played by Colin O'Donoghue.

Hook is born Killian Jones, who becomes captain of the Jolly Roger after his brother's death. His hand is cut off by the dark trickster Rumpelstiltskin as revenge for Hook running away with his wife. In order to find a way to kill Rumplestiltskin, Hook travels to Neverland, where he spends over 100 years before escaping back to the Enchanted Forest. Hook teams up with Cora, the Queen of Hearts, and they travel to the Land Without Magic after the curse is broken.

2012 Summer Olympics opening ceremony
Alongside other inflatable villains such as Lord Voldemort, the Queen of Hearts, Cruella de Vil, and The Child Catcher, Captain Hook made an appearance during the opening ceremony of the XXX Olympiad in London, representing one of the villains of British children's literature.

Peter Pan Live! (2014 TV special)
Christopher Walken plays Captain Hook in the musical production Peter Pan Live! which was broadcast live by NBC in December 2014.  Compared to the 1954 musical on which it was based, this show sought to "strengthen and deepen" the portrayal of Captain Hook. Hook and his pirate crew perform songs from the original musical, such as "Hook's Tango", in addition to new songs such as "Vengeance" and "Only Pretend".

The Pirate Fairy
In this animated prequel, Tom Hiddleston voices a younger pirate named James who starts as a crew member of a ship captained by Zarina, a young fairy who steals blue pixie dust from Tinker Bell's home tree and turns pirate to pursue her alchemical experiments with pixie dust after being pushed away by the home tree's conservative leadership.  As the story progresses, it becomes clear that James will one day become Captain Hook.

Pan
In this prequel, Garrett Hedlund portrays a younger James Hook, one of the main protagonists, who teams up with Peter Pan to escape Blackbeard's mines in Neverland and joins forces with the native tribe.  Although initially only interested in leaving Neverland, Hook is attracted to Tiger Lily (Rooney Mara) and assists her and Peter in the final confrontation in the fairy kingdom. At the film's conclusion, he joins Peter and Tiger Lily in rescuing other children from Peter's old orphanage back in London. Hook in this film is different from the original character, and is portrayed as a pioneer-era American without any connection with Eton, Blackbeard, or piracy in general.

Peter and Wendy (2015 TV film)
In the ITV film Peter and Wendy, he is played by Stanley Tucci.

Come Away
Hook is played by David Gyasi in the 2020 movie Come Away as CJ, a ruthless pawnbroker and crime lord who is also the son of the Mad Hatter, the paternal uncle of Alice and Peter Pan, and the paternal great-uncle of the Darling children, Wendy, Michael and John.

Lost Girls
Iain Glen plays Hook in the 2022 movie The Lost Girls.

See also
List of amputees in film

References

External links

Captain Hook in the Disney Archives – Villains

Theatre characters introduced in 1904
Animated human characters
Fictional English people
Fictional amputees
Fictional kidnappers
Fictional murderers
Fictional people educated at Eton College
Fictional sea pirates
Hook
Fictional swordfighters
Male characters in film
Male characters in literature
Male film villains
Male literary villains
Peter Pan characters
Prosthetics in fiction